The table below lists the reasons delivered from the bench by the Supreme Court of Canada during 1997. The table illustrates what reasons were filed by each justice in each case, and which justices joined each reason. This list, however, does not include reasons on motions.

Reasons

References

External links 
 1997 decisions: CanLII LexUM

Reasons Of The Supreme Court Of Canada, 1997
1997